R.E. Mountain Secondary is a public high school in northern Langley, British Columbia and is a part of School District 35 Langley. It originally opened in 1977 and was relocated to a new facility in 2019. As of 2014, the school no longer offers Grade 8 as Yorkson Creek Middle School took the position. As of the 2020-2021 schoolyear, the administration changed the schedule layout to a quarterly system as a response to the COVID-19 pandemic in British Columbia.

International Baccalaureate Program
R.E. Mountain Secondary offers the International Baccalaureate program for Grade 11 and 12 students. It is currently the only school in Langley to offer the program. The program is preceded by the Pre-IB Honours program for grades 9 to 10. Students completing the honours program are not required to enter the IB program.

Fine arts
R.E. Mountain Secondary delivers extensive IB and non-IB programs in the Arts, Music, and Drama. The school currently offers varied levels of competitive and non-competitive choirs and bands. The music program has two directors, a choir director, and a band director. The ensembles at the school include Senior Concert Choir, Senior and Intermediate Vocal Jazz, Senior Chamber Choir, Senior and Intermediate Jazz Band, and Senior and Intermediate Concert Band.

The school has a theatre company entitled "A Class Act" as well as a seasonal Improv Drama team.

There is also a visual arts program including sculpting, painting, drawing, photography, and film. The latter two are taught in separate classes, and the school has a dark room and a small film program.

Athletics
Mountain has an athletics program that focuses primarily on soccer, basketball, and volleyball. The Langley Events Centre is adjacent to the school, providing facilities for extension of the school athletics. A 'Strength and Conditioning' program broadens the athletic focus to include year-round attention to non-sport specific training. The current athletics department includes rugby, badminton, ice-hockey, dragon boating, cross country running and track & field.

Deaf and Hard Of Hearing Program
R.E. Mountain used to house the Langley school district's Deaf and Hard of Hearing program, but that program is no longer operating as a separate program.

Notable alumni
Lights, musician
Dennis Cholowski, hockey player
Kellin Deglan, baseball player
Brad Turner, jazz musician
Sunny Chen, actor and singer-songwriter
Kenny Wong, Kya's father

References

External links
R.E. Mountain Secondary School

High schools in British Columbia
International Baccalaureate schools in British Columbia
School District 35 Langley
Schools for the deaf in Canada
Educational institutions established in 1977
1977 establishments in British Columbia